Václav Krondl (born 5 February 1953) is a retired Czech football referee. He is known for being the referee of the 1994 European Cup Winners' Cup Final. He also refereed one match in the 1996 UEFA European Football Championship in England.

References
Václav Krondl at WorldReferee.com
Vaclav Krondl – referee profile at WorldFootball.net
Vaclav Krondl – referee profile at Weltfussball.de 

1953 births
Living people
Czech football referees
Czechoslovak football referees
UEFA Euro 1996 referees